William White Bent (1800 – April 22, 1866) was a political figure in Nova Scotia. He represented Amherst township from 1847 to 1859 in the Nova Scotia House of Assembly as a Conservative member.

He was born in Amherst, Nova Scotia on January 7, 1800, the son of John Bent and Mary Lunt. He died in Amherst.

References 
 A Directory of the Members of the Legislative Assembly of Nova Scotia, 1758-1958, Public Archives of Nova Scotia (1958)
 https://www.familysearch.org/library/books/viewer/320988/?offset=9#page=51&viewer=picture&o=download&n=0&q=

1800 births
1866 deaths
Progressive Conservative Association of Nova Scotia MLAs